Malesherbia weberbaueri is a subshrub native to Apurímac, Ayacucho, Huancavelica and Junín. It is found at altitudes of 2300-3600 meters.

Malesherbia weberbaueri has yellow-green flowers in racemes. Previously, M. weberbaueri had two varieties, var. weberbaueri and var. galjufii. These varieties differed in locality. Neither variety is currently accepted. 

As of 2007, M. werebaueri is classified as vulnerable.

References 

weberbaueri